Plagiophiale is a genus of fungi within the Melanconidaceae family.

References

External links
Plagiophiale at Index Fungorum

Melanconidaceae